Sport Vereniging Racing Club Aruba, known as SV Racing Club Aruba or RCA, is an Aruban football club based in Solito, Oranjestad, which currently play in Aruban Division di Honor, the nation's top level league. , they had won 16 titles since the league's creation under the auspices of the Arubaanse Voetbal Bond in 1960.

Achievements
Aruban Division di Honor: 16
 1960, 1964, 1967, 1978, 1979, 1986, 1987, 1991, 1994, 2002, 2007–08, 2010–11, 2011–12, 2014–15, 2015–16, 2018–19
Netherlands Antilles Championship: 1
 1965
Torneo Copa Betico Croes: 1
 2011–12, 2015–16

Performance in CONCACAF competitions

 CFU Club Championship: 1 appearance
2007: First Round (stage 1 of 4) – (3rd in Group B, 1 pt)

References

Racing Club Aruba
1934 establishments in Aruba
Association football clubs established in 1934